The 2021 season was the 114th season in which the Richmond Football Club has participated in the VFL/AFL and the second season in which it participated in the AFL Women's competition.

AFL

2020 off-season list changes

Retirements and delistings

Trades

National draft

Rookie draft

Pre-season supplemental selection period

Mid-season draft

2021 squad

2021 season

Pre-season community series

Home and away season

Awards

League awards

22 Under 22 team

Club awards

Jack Dyer Medal

Michael Roach Medal

AFL Women's

2020 off-season list changes

Special assistance
After poor on-field performances in 2020, the AFL decided to award special assistance to Richmond in the form of an end-of-first round draft (originally number 15 overall) selection which the club was required to on-trade to another club in exchange for an established player. The pick was eventually traded to acquire  midfielder Sarah Hosking.

Retirements and delistings

Trades

National draft

2020 squad

2021 season

Home and away season

Awards

League awards

AFLW Players' Association Best First-Year Player

All-Australian team

22 Under 22 team

Club awards

Best and Fairest award

Leading goalkicker award

Victorian Football League (men's reserves)

The 2021 season will mark the seventh year the Richmond Football Club run a stand-alone reserves team in the Victorian Football League/Eastern Australian league. Richmond senior and rookie-listed players who are not selected to play in the AFL side will be eligible to play for the team alongside a small squad of VFL/EAFL-only listed players.

The team finished the home and away season with four wins, one draw and five losses.
AFL listed midfielder Will Martyn won the team's best and fairest award and Samson Ryan won the club's goal kicking award with 17 goals from nine matches.

Playing squad

VFLW (women's reserves)
After running a stand-alone VFLW team since 2018, Richmond elected not to renew the club's license to participate in the 2021 season. Instead, Richmond players represented Port Melbourne under an alignment model. The season ran concurrently with part of the AFLW season for the first time, meaning unselected AFLW players took part in VFLW football as a reserves-grade competition. After the end of the AFLW season, players from the senior side also took part in matches for the club, including into the final series.

Port Melbourne finished the 14-game season with 10 wins and four losses, placing third on the ladder. The club was eliminated in the first round of the finals, following a 3.5 (23) to 7.15 (57) elimination final loss to the Southern Saints at ETU Stadium.

References

External links 
 Richmond Tigers Official AFL Site
 Official Site of the Australian Football League

Richmond Football Club seasons
Richmond